Kerguelen may refer to:

Geography
 Kerguelen Islands, in the southern Indian Ocean and French territory
 Kerguelen Plateau, submerged continent in the southern Indian Ocean and the foundation of the Kerguelen Islands
 Kerguelen hotspot, a geological hotspot in the Kerguelen Plateau

Biography
 Michel Kerguélen (1928–1999), French botanist
 Yves-Joseph de Kerguelen-Trémarec (1734-1797), French explorer

Music
 Kerguelen Vortex, an EP released in 2011 by the Japanese group Aural Vampire

Shipping
 CMA CGM Kerguelen, Britain's largest container ship (as of May 2015)